Grigoris Toskas (born 8 January 1983) is a former Greek footballer. Toskas played for AEK Athens , Kerkyra , Ionikos, Kallithea, Egaleo, and Pannaxiakos.

He is the son of the former AEK Athens defender, Apostolos Toskas.

References

1983 births
Living people
AEK Athens F.C. players
A.O. Kerkyra players
Ionikos F.C. players
Kallithea F.C. players
Kalamata F.C. players
Egaleo F.C. players
Association football defenders
Footballers from Athens
Greek footballers